
Lesbians on Ecstasy is a Canadian electronic band formed in 2003 in Montreal, Quebec.

The band toured across Canada and the U.S. with Le Tigre before the release of their first recording.
The first album, the self-titled Lesbians on Ecstasy was released on October 26, 2004. In 2005, the song from this recording entitled "Bitchsy", a re-take of the Fifth Column song "All Women Are Bitches",  was featured on the TV series Queer as Folk. That same year, Lesbians on Ecstasy was chosen as the "Album of the Year" by U.S. magazine The Advocate. 

In the summer of 2005, the band released their follow-up recording Giggles in the Dark, an LP of Lesbians on Ecstasy remixes by Le Tigre, Scream Club, Tracy and the Plastics, Kids on TV (featuring Maggie MacDonald), 1-Speed Bike, DJ AÏ, Jody Bleyle (formerly of Team Dresch), Katastrophe and Sean Kosa. Additional remixes were available for download on the web site by French producer Electrosexual, and Branx. The band's third full-length release, entitled We Know You Know came out in the spring of 2007.

The band's name is a reference to Chicks on Speed.

Discography

Albums
2004:  Lesbians on Ecstasy CD, Alien8 Recordings
2005:  Giggles in the Dark Remix LP, CD, Alien8 Recordings
2007:  We Know You Know LP, CD, Alien8 Recordings

Singles and EPs
2004:  "Tell Me Does She Love The Bass"/"U Feel Love", split 12" with The Unireverse on Total Zero Records

MP3
2005:  Tell Me Does She Love the Bass (Electrosexual remix),  Alien8 Recordings

Compilations
2006:  "Don't _ with the. aiff" on A Silence Broken, Public Record

References

External links
lesbiansonecstasy.com
Free download of A Silence Broken at Public Record Website
Free official download of Tell me does she love the bass Electrosexual remix at Lesbians on Ecstasy Website
PUNKCAST#1132 Live video from Studio B, Brooklyn, April 5, 2007. (RealPlayer, mp4)

Musical groups established in 2003
Musical groups from Montreal
Canadian electronic music groups
Alien8 Recordings artists
All-female punk bands
Electroclash groups
Lesbian culture in Canada
Canadian lesbian musicians
LGBT-themed musical groups
Queercore groups
English-language musical groups from Quebec
Musical quartets
LGBT culture in Montreal
Canadian LGBT musicians
Canadian women in electronic music
2003 establishments in Quebec